Jacob Stewart Hacker (born 1971) is an American professor and political scientist. He is the director of the Institution for Social and Policy Studies and a professor of political science at Yale University. Hacker has written works on social policy, health care reform, and economic insecurity in the United States.

Early life and education

Hacker was born and raised in Eugene, Oregon. He graduated summa cum laude in 1994 from Harvard University with a B.A. in social studies, and he received his Ph.D. from Yale in political science in 2000. His first book, The Road to Nowhere: The Genesis of President Clinton's Plan for Health Security, was published in 1996, while he was a graduate student at Yale.

Career

Hacker is a media contributor and has testified before the United States Congress. He was widely recognized as a contributor to the health care plans for three of the leading Democratic candidates — Barack Obama, Hillary Clinton, and John Edwards — in the presidential election of 2008. Hacker's plan, Health Care for America, is outlined in a report for the Economic Policy Institute.  It proposes providing health care for uninsured or under-insured Americans by requiring employers to either provide insurance to their workers or enroll them in a new, publicly overseen insurance pool. People in this pool could choose either a public plan modeled after Medicare or from regulated private plans.

Hacker's work with the international think tank Policy Network has had a major influence on the policies of many European political parties and his concept of pre-distribution has become a cornerstone of the UK Labour Party's economic policy and his name has even been mentioned by Prime Minister David Cameron during Prime Minister's Questions in the House of Commons.

Hacker was a fellow at New America in 1999 and 2002. In 2007 he co-chaired the National Academy of Social Insurance's conference, "For the Common Good," and oversees a Social Science Research Council project on the "privatization of risk."

Hacker's 2010 book, the New York Times bestseller Winner-Take-All Politics: How Washington Made the Richer Richer--and Turned Its Back on the Middle Class (Simon & Schuster), written with Paul Pierson of UC Berkeley, argues that since the late 1970s the American middle and working classes have fallen further and further behind economically because policy changes in government favor the rich and super-rich.

Their 2016 book American Amnesia: How the War on Government Led Us to Forget What Made America Prosper argues for the restoration and reinvigoration of the United States mixed economy.

In 2017, he was elected a Fellow of the American Academy of Arts and Sciences.

The Economic Security Index (ESI)
In July 2010 the Economic Security Index was launched. Developed by Hacker and a multi-disciplinary research team with support from the Rockefeller Foundation, the ESI measures the share of Americans who experience at least a 25 percent decline in their income from one year to the next and who lack an adequate financial safety net to replace this lost income.

Personal life

Hacker is married to Oona A. Hathaway, a Professor of Law at Yale University and former Supreme Court clerk to Sandra Day O'Connor.

Works
 Let them eat Tweets : how the right rules in an age of extreme inequality, with Paul Pierson, New York, NY : Liveright Publishing Corporation, 2020.

See also

Pre-distribution
Policy Network

References

External links
Jacob Hacker on his new book Winner-Take-All Politics - video interview by Democracy Now!

1971 births
American political scientists
Harvard College alumni
Living people
Writers from Eugene, Oregon
Yale Graduate School of Arts and Sciences alumni
Yale University faculty
Social Science Research Council
New America (organization)
20th-century American Jews
21st-century American Jews